The state of Kansas is served by the following area codes:
316, which serves the city of Wichita and the surrounding area.
620, which serves most of southern Kansas, excluding those areas covered by the 316 area code.
785, which serves most of northern Kansas, excluding those areas covered by the 913 area code.
913, which serves the Kansas portion of the Kansas City Metropolitan Area.

Area code list
 
Kansas
Area codes